The Hornblower Brothers are a four-piece band based in Brighton, England. Their debut EP Adventures in the National Geographic was released on Bell Boy Records in October 2009. They released the single "Give and Receivers" / "Ghost of Kerouac" on Static Caravan Recordings on 19 April 2010. In 2010 the band took a break before reforming early in 2015.

The Hornblower Brothers returned to action in 2016 with a new EP Free Range for Bleeding Heart Recordings, and a live session on Marc Riley's BBC Radio 6 Music. The band subsequently released the An Uncomprehensive Retrospective (2008–2016) compilation album and a follow-up single "Popping Round The Bend" on its own Pap Records label.

Musical style
The Hornblower Brothers style has often been compared to Half Man Half Biscuit and Jeffrey Lewis, mainly due to the prominent use of satirical lyrics and an off-kilter pop style.

Discography
Singles/EPs
 "Popping Round The Bend" / "Asthma Attack" – Pap Records (2018)
 Free Range EP – Bleeding Heart Recordings (2016)
 "Give and Receivers" / "The Ghost of Kerouac" – Static Caravan Recordings (19 April 2010)
 Adventures in the National Geographic – Bell Boy Records (2 November 2009)

Album
 An Uncomprehensive Retrospective (2008–2016) – Pap Records (2017)

Misc.
Marc Riley live session on BBC 6 Music (2016)
"Mossy Epitaph", on the compilation album Sea Monsters – One Inch Badge Records (2011)
Marc Riley live session on BBC 6 Music (2010)
"Christmas Song", on the compilation album A Very Cherry Christmas Volume 6 – Cherryade Records (2010)
"Christmas Song", on the compilation album Krampus Is Coming – One Inch Badge Records (2009)

Members

Current members
 Nathaniel Forrester – vocals, guitars, keyboards (2004–present)
 Alistair Johnstone – drums, percussion, guitar, vocals (2004–present)
 John Stokdyk – bass guitar, whistling (2015–present)
 Michael Baser – keyboards, melodica (2015–present)

Former members
 Gary Cox – keyboards, melodica (2005–2010)
 James Emery – bass guitar (2005–2010)
 Antony Groves – drums, percussion (2005–2010)

References

External links
The Hornblower Brothers' Bandcamp page
2010 Interview with Gigwise
Review of "Adventures In The National Geographic" on The Skinny
Interview with Brighton Source

English indie rock groups
British indie pop groups
Musical groups from Brighton and Hove
Anti-folk musicians
Folk punk musicians